Sega tambour of Rodrigues Island is one of the types of Sega music of Mauritius, with origins in the Rodrigues Island, a small island about  in area.

Description
Sega Tambour of Rodrigues Island is a performance of music and dance with its origins in slave communities.

See also
 Music of Mauritius
 Sega

References

 
Intangible Cultural Heritage of Humanity